The Museum of Anthropology, University of Athens is an educational museum in Athens, Greece. It was founded at the University of Athens in 1886.

The museum was initially established as part of the university's medical school, in its department of histology.
The museum's founder, Klon Stephanos, has been described as the "father of physical anthropology" in Greece,  Under Stephanos, the museum emphasized its function as research laboratory, rather than as a venue for public displays.  It received many early contributions from the medical faculty in the area of anatomical pathology, as well as becoming an important repository within Greece for historical anthropological specimens that had in the past been sent to foreign institutions.

Stephanos died in 1915, and Ioannis Koumaris became the second director of the museum, a position he held until 1950.

References

Sevasti Trubeta, »Griechisch-deutsche rassenanthropologische Begegnungen (1886–1950)«, in: Alexandros-Andreas Kyrtsis und Miltos Pechlivanos (Hg.), Compendium der deutsch-griechischen Verflechtungen, 20.10.2020, URI: https://comdeg.eu/compendium/essay/99306/.

External links
Official site

Anthropology museums
Athens
Museums in Athens
National and Kapodistrian University of Athens
1886 establishments in Greece